The 1909 Tasmanian state election was held on Friday, 30 April 1909 in the Australian state of Tasmania to elect 30 members of the Tasmanian House of Assembly. This was the first general election in the British Empire to elect all members through a form of proportional representation, the single transferable vote.

At the 1909 election there was a reduction in the number of members from 35 to 30 and the first statewide use of the Hare-Clark electoral system.

Six members were elected from each of five electorates. 

The election saw an increase in Labour seats from 7 to 12, at the expense of the Anti-Socialist Party.

The Hare-Clark system
The Tasmanian House of Assembly had, from its inception in 1856, used a plurality voting system to elect members from one or two-seat electorates. In 1896, the Tasmanian attorney-general, Andrew Inglis Clark, suggested the House adopt a single transferable vote system devised by Englishman Thomas Hare with certain variations devised by himself, which became known as the Hare-Clark system. The system was used on a trial basis in the Hobart and Launceston electorates from the 1897 election onwards, but was never used in the country electorates and was repealed in 1901, with the districts being broken up at the 1903 election. In order to blunt the emergence of the Labour Party which won eight seats in the 1906 election, Clark convinced the House to apply the Hare-Clark system statewide.

The outgoing House at the election was represented by 35 single-member districts. The adoption of the Hare-Clark system saw the number of seats in the House reduced from 35 to 30, and six members for each of five electorates (corresponding to the federal electoral divisions of Bass, Darwin, Denison, Franklin and Wilmot) would be elected using proportional representation.

Key dates

Results

|}

Distribution of seats

Aftermath
The Anti-Socialist Party (previously known as the Free Trade Party) was a coalition of conservative parliamentarians, exhorted by incumbent Premier John Evans to combine their forces against the threat from the Labour Party who had won an unprecedented 12 seats. Evans offered to resign if asked, and in June was taken to his word, with Elliott Lewis elected as leader and premier with a pledge of twelve months loyalty. A faction of Liberals led by Norman Ewing undermined Lewis' leadership, culminating in a no-confidence motion in October 1909 which led to the Governor of Tasmania Sir Harry Barron calling on John Earle to form Tasmania's first Labour ministry, a minority government which lasted only a week before being voted out by the House.

See also
 Members of the Tasmanian House of Assembly, 1909–1912
Candidates of the 1909 Tasmanian state election

References

External links
 
Report of Committee on General Election, 1909, Tasmanian Electoral Commission, 18 August 1909.

Elections in Tasmania
1909 elections in Australia
1900s in Tasmania
April 1909 events